The Jiangxi University of Finance and Economics is a public, coeducational research university located in Nanchang, the capital city of Jiangxi province, China.

History 
Jiangxi University of Finance and Economics (JUFE), founded in 1923 in Nanchang, Jiangxi Province. As one of the six business schools affiliated to the Ministry of Finance, of the People's Republic of China, the university offers programs in business and management.

Rankings and reputation 
As of 2022, Jiangxi University of Finance and Economics ranked # 2 in East China region after Shanghai University of Finance and Economics and # 7 nationwide among universities specialized in finance, business, and economics in the Best Chinese Universities Ranking. Jiangxi University of Finance and Economics has been ranked amongst the top # 500 universities in the world for "Economics".

Notable alumni
Wang Wenjing, billionaire businessman, chairman of Yonyou

References

Universities in Nanchang
2023 establishments in China